H. F. Gierke III (born Herman Fredrick Gierke III; March 13, 1943 – August 7, 2016) was an American judge who served as the Chief Judge of the United States Court of Appeals for the Armed Forces from 2004 to 2006. He was a Judge of the United States Court of Appeals for the Armed Forces, from 1991 to 2004, and a Justice of the North Dakota Supreme Court from 1983 to 1991. Gierke also served as the National Commander of The American Legion, from 1988 to 1989.

Early life and career 
Gierke earned his Bachelor of Arts and juris doctor degrees from the University of North Dakota. From there, he went on to serve in the United States Army Judge Advocate General's Corps between 1967 and 1971. This included one year as a military judge in Vietnam. During his active military service, he was awarded the Bronze Star Medal, Air Medal, Vietnam service and campaign medals. In 1983, Governor Allen Olson appointed him Justice of the North Dakota Supreme Court.

He was elected in 1984 and re-elected in 1986 for a 10-year term. In 1991, he resigned from the North Dakota Supreme court when President George H. W. Bush appointed him to the United States Court of Appeals for the Armed Forces. On October 1, 2004, he assumed duties of chief judge on the court of appeals. He later moved to Orlando, Florida, where he was a visiting professor, distinguished jurist, and adjunct instructor at the Dwayne O. Andreas School of Law (1998-2008).

The American Legion 
A member of Carl E. Rogen Post No. 29 of The American Legion in Watford City, North Dakota, his slogan as national commander was "Proud to be an American." Prior to his election as national commander at the Legion's 70th National Convention in Louisville, Kentucky, he served as commander of Post No. 29 (at age 36), as Department of North Dakota commander from 1983-1984, and as national vice commander from 1985-1986. During his tenure as national commander, Gierke was called upon to lead the initial challenges to the Supreme Court's Texas v. Johnson decision, which extended free speech rights to desecration of the U.S. flag.

Death 
Gierke died on August 7, 2016, at the age of 73, in Bismarck, North Dakota.

Honors 
Gierke served as President of the North Dakota Blue Star Bar Association (1982-1983) and was an award winning professor at the George Washington University Law School and The Catholic University of America. In 2002 and 2004, he was honored as the Best Adjunct Faculty Member at CUA's Columbus School of Law.

See also 

List of justices of the North Dakota Supreme Court
List of people from North Dakota
List of University of North Dakota people

References

External links

1943 births
2016 deaths
20th-century American judges
United States Army personnel of the Vietnam War
Barry University faculty
Columbus School of Law faculty
Florida A&M University faculty
George Washington University faculty
Judges of the United States Court of Appeals for the Armed Forces
National Commanders of the American Legion
Justices of the North Dakota Supreme Court
People from Williston, North Dakota
Recipients of the Air Medal
United States Army officers
United States Article I federal judges appointed by George H. W. Bush
University of North Dakota alumni